James 'Bucky' Mutscheller (March 31, 1930 – April 10, 2015) was an American football player who played tight end for nine seasons for the Baltimore Colts. Mutscheller played football, basketball, and baseball at Beaver Falls High School, and three seasons of varsity football at Notre Dame under coach Frank Leahy from 1949 to 1951, including on the 1949 national championship team. Mutscheller played both defensive end and offense for the Fighting Irish, and served as team captain his senior year.

The New York Yanks drafted Mutscheller, but by the time Bucky's two-year stint in the Marines ended, the Baltimore Colts had bought his contract. Mutscheller played for the Colts from 1954 to 1961, amassing 220 catches, 3685 yards, and 40 touchdowns.

In 1976, Mutscheller was inducted into the inaugural class of the Beaver County Sports Hall of Fame. He was also inducted into the Western PA hall of fame and the Pennsylvania hall of fame.

He died of kidney failure on April 10, 2015.

References

1930 births
2015 deaths
American football tight ends
Baltimore Colts announcers
Baltimore Colts players
National Football League announcers
Notre Dame Fighting Irish football players
People from Beaver Falls, Pennsylvania
Players of American football from Pennsylvania
Western Conference Pro Bowl players